Colin Chapman (born Colin Anthony Chapman; 8 June 1971, in Bradford, Yorkshire, England) was an English wicket-keeper and a right-handed batsman for Yorkshire.

He played eight first-class cricket matches in his career, which was hampered by Yorkshire preferring Richard Blakey. A decent batsman in his own right, Chapman scored 238 runs, with a highest score of 80 at an average of 21.63.  He took thirteen catches behind the stumps and completed three stumpings.

He played 10 List A matches, scoring 94 runs at an average of 31.33, with a top score of 36 not out.

References

External links
Cricinfo Profile

1971 births
Living people
Yorkshire cricketers
Cricketers from Bradford
English cricketers
Wicket-keepers